Marko Dujković (born March 21, 1990) is a Serbian professional basketball player who plays for Kb Çair 2030 of the Macedonian Second League. He is also a member of the Macedonian national team.

References

External links
RealGM profile
FIBA profile

1990 births
Living people
Macedonian men's basketball players
Basketball League of Serbia players
Centers (basketball)
KK Metalac Valjevo players
Sportspeople from Kumanovo
Serbs of North Macedonia
Macedonian people of Serbian descent